Richard Mee Raikes (1784–1863) was an English banker, Governor of the Bank of England from 1833 to 1834. He had been Deputy Governor from 1832 to 1833. He replaced John Horsley Palmer as Governor and was succeeded by James Pattison. He was bankrupted in 1834.

See also
Chief Cashier of the Bank of England

References

External links

Governors of the Bank of England
1784 births
1863 deaths
British bankers
Deputy Governors of the Bank of England
Raikes family
19th-century British businesspeople